Descurainia bourgaeana (hierba pajonera or flixweed) is a species of flowering plant in the family Brassicaceae endemic to Las Cañadas del Teide on Tenerife and La Palma in the Canary Islands.

Descurainia bourgaeana grows as shrubby clumps about 1 metre in height with yellow flowers.

References 

 Barbara E. Goodson, Arnoldo Santos-Guerra, and Robert K. Jansen, Molecular systematics of Descurainia (Brassicaceae) in the Canary Islands: biogeographic and taxonomic implications, Taxon 55 (3), August 2006: 671–682
 Flora of the Mt. Teide National Park

bourgaeana
Endemic flora of the Canary Islands
Taxa named by Asa Gray